The 1911 VFL Grand Final was an Australian rules football game contested between the Essendon Football Club and Collingwood Football Club, held at the Melbourne Cricket Ground in Melbourne on 23 September 1911. It was the 14th annual Grand Final of the Victorian Football League, staged to determine the premiers for the 1911 VFL season. The match, attended by 43,905 spectators, was won by Essendon by a margin of 6 points, marking that club's second premiership victory.

Right to challenge
This season was played under the amended Argus system. Essendon was the minor premier, and Collingwood had finished fourth. The teams both qualified for this match by winning their semi-finals matches.

If Collingwood had won this match, Essendon would have had the right to challenge Collingwood to a rematch for the premiership on the following weekend, because Essendon was the minor premier. The winner of that match would then have won the premiership.

Teams

 Umpire – Jack Elder

Statistics

Goalkickers

See also
 1911 VFL season

References

VFL/AFL Grand Finals
Grand
Essendon Football Club
Collingwood Football Club
September 1911 sports events